The European Union employs a variety of public accountability measures to review and reform budgets across government. As the EU's budget is at risk of maladministration, every year the Court of Auditors reports on the management of the budget. European Union auditors have stated that as they implement more transparency and double-entry book-keeping systems, it is likely to improve budget management.

In order to strengthen the means of fraud prevention, the Commission established the European Anti-Fraud Office, also known as OLAF, on 28 April 1999, under the European Commission Decision 1999/352. The Office was given responsibility for conducting administrative anti-fraud investigations by having conferred on it a special independent status.

Auditing
The Court of Auditors checks that all the Union's revenue has been received and all its expenditure incurred in a lawful and regular manner and that the EU budget has been managed soundly. The Court was established on 22 July 1975 by the Budgetary Treaty of 1975. The Court started operating as an external Community audit body in October 1977.

Transparency
The meetings of the Council of Ministers (the relevant Minister from each member state) are mostly public. A webcast on the sessions can also be seen on the website of the Council.

Also, the standard of plenary sittings of the European Parliament is to stream the debates over the Internet. In addition, the public can observe sittings directly from a separate gallery. Also, nearly all sittings of Parliamentary Committees are observable by the public, except for certain matters such as requests for removal of the parliamentary immunity of a Member of the European Parliament.

In addition, the activities of the European Commission are subject to transparency. The monitoring of the Commission has to be performed by a body that is independent of the Commission, such as "European Anti-Fraud Office" (OLAF) that reports to the European Parliament.

See also
 Resignation of the Santer Commission
 Marta Andreasen - former Chief Accountant of the European Union. She criticises the European Union accounting system for being open to fraud.
 Paul van Buitenen - former auditor in the European Union who denounced fraud and mismanagement within the commission and the abuse of the EU expenses and staff allowance system.
 List of books on the European Union

References

Books on the subject 
 Andreas Oldag, Hans-Martin Tillack: Raumschiff Brüssel – Wie die Demokratie in Europa scheitert (in German, Spaceship Brussels – How Democracy in Europe fails), Argon Verlag, 2003 (1st ed., hardcover),  / Fischer, Frankfurt 2004 (2nd ed.) , 
 Paul van Buitenen: Blowing the Whistle: Fraud in the European Commission, Politicos Pub, 2000,

External links
 European Anti-Fraud Office (OLAF)

European Union law
Political corruption
Corruption in Europe
Transparency (behavior)

de:Korruption in der Europäischen Union
es:Oficina Europea de Lucha contra el Fraude